This is a list of siege engines invented through history. A siege engine is a weapon used to destroy fortifications such as defensive walls, castles, bunkers and fortified gates.

By age, oldest to newest

Further reading
Siege engine
Ballista
Battering ram
Petrary
Siege tower

References 

siege engines
Siege engines